Slieau Freoaghane (Manx for 'mountain of the bilberry') is a hill on the Isle of Man, and the second highest of the Island's five Marilyns. It is located in the Sheading of Michael and can be climbed from Kirk Michael or Barregarrow to the west, from Brandy Cottage to the south, or from Druidale in the east. The summit is marked with a trig point.

See also
Hills and mountains of the Isle of Man
Geography of the Isle of Man

References

External links

Marilyns of the Isle of Man
Mountains and hills of the Isle of Man